Heinsdorfergrund is a municipality in the Vogtlandkreis district, in Saxony, Germany. The municipality was first mentioned in 1323 as Heinrichesdorf.

References 

Municipalities in Saxony
Vogtlandkreis